Szokol or Szokoll is a Hungarian-language surname. The word is the transliteration of the Slavic word "Sokol". The surname may refer to:

 Zsolt Szokol (born 1990), Hungarian football defender 
 Carl Szokoll (1915–2004), Austrian resistance fighter
 Marco Szokoll (born 1981), Italian Deejay

Hungarian-language surnames